Demetrio Mendoza Cortes  (August 14, 1921 – March 29, 1993) was the first Mayor of Mandaue City and last Municipal Mayor of Mandaue. He served 26 years as mayor. He was also municipal councilor and a lawyer by profession.

References

Mayors of Mandaue
People from Mandaue
Nacionalista Party politicians
Filipino city and municipal councilors
1921 births
1993 deaths